Gymnophobia is a fear (phobia) of nudity.

Symptoms
Gymnophobics experience anxiety from nudity, even if they realize their fear is irrational. They may worry about seeing others naked, being seen naked, or both. Their fear may stem from a general anxiety about sexuality, from a fear that they are physically inferior, or from a fear that their nakedness leaves them exposed and unprotected.

Gymnophobia refers to an actual fear of nudity, but most sufferers with the condition learn how to function in general society despite the condition. They may, for example, avoid ill fitted and revealing clothes, changing rooms, washrooms, showers, and beaches. However, the condition can be regarded as hypochondriasis or an anxiety disorder if the person cannot control the phobia or it is interfering with their daily life. 

Gymnophobia has been likened to the fictional condition "never-nude" portrayed in the comedy series Arrested Development.

Etymology
The term gymnophobia comes from the Greek γυμνός - gumnos, "naked" and  φόβος - phobos, "fear". A phobia that has a significant amount of overlap with gymnophobia is dishabiliophobia, which is the fear of undressing in front of others.

See also
Sex-negativity
List of phobias

References

Phobias
Prudishness